"Have in Mind" is a song by German synth-pop band Cetu Javu, released as a single in 1988. A new remixed version later appeared on their 1990 debut album Southern Lands.

Track listings
12" vinyl
US & GER: ZYX Records / ZYX-6053-12

CD single
 GER: ZYX Records / ZYX 6053-8

12" vinyl
Hong Kong: Double Groove / DG 9101

References

1988 songs
1988 singles
Cetu Javu songs
ZYX Music singles